San Carlos Municipality may refer to:
 San Carlos Municipality, Santa Cruz, Bolivia
 San Carlos Municipality, Antioquia, Colombia
 San Carlos, Córdoba, Colombia
 San Carlos, Morazán, El Salvador
 San Carlos Municipality, Tamaulipas, Mexico
 San Carlos, Río San Juan, Nicaragua
 San Carlos Municipality, Cojedes, Venezuela

Municipality name disambiguation pages